Brent Reilly (born 12 November 1983) is a former Australian rules footballer who played for the Adelaide Football Club in the Australian Football League (AFL). He was recruited by the club with draft pick #12 in the 2001 National Draft. He retired on 13 May 2015 after suffering a fractured skull in a training mishap earlier in the year. He played 203 games for the Crows.

AFL career
Debuting in 2002 as an 18-year-old, Reilly took his time to develop, struggling to retain his spot in the side under the coaching of Gary Ayres. The appointment of Neil Craig as coach in mid-2004 significantly helped his development, with the youngster beginning to earn selection on a consistent basis, and winning the club's first AFL Rising Star nomination for four years in round 16 against . He played every home-and-away game in the 2005 season and the first final, before missing the last two with a hamstring injury, and ever since he has been a regular in the Crows' 22, renowned for his long and accurate kicking.

In 2009, with many younger players pressing their claims for selection, Reilly was one of a number of players with their places in the side under pressure, being dropped a number of times. However, he responded with a string of strong performances, and again entrenched himself in the Crows' best side. With the departure of Robert Shirley at the end of the season, Reilly began to make his name in 2010 in a new role as a tagger, most notably in the club's upset victory over Geelong, in which he kept superstar Gary Ablett to only 19 possessions.

Reilly played his 150th game against  in round 18, 2011, in what was to be Neil Craig's final game as coach. Late in the season he was trialled as a rebounding defender, a role that he continued in 2012 to great effect, being named in the 40-man All-Australian squad for that year. In Round 14, 2013 Reilly injured his shoulder, requiring a full reconstruction that ended his season and curtailed his preparation for the next season.

Reilly played 10 games in 2014, including his 200th match against  in round 13.

Statistics
 '

|- style="background:#eaeaea;"
! scope="row" style="text-align:center" | 2002
| style="text-align:center" | 
| 33 || 1 || 0 || 0 || 0 || 1 || 1 || 0 || 1 || 0.0 || 0.0 || 0.0 || 1.0 || 1.0 || 0.0 || 1.0
|-
! scope="row" style="text-align:center" | 2003
| style="text-align:center" | 
| 33 || 6 || 4 || 6 || 30 || 16 || 46 || 19 || 2 || 0.7 || 1.0 || 5.0 || 2.7 || 7.7 || 3.2 || 0.3
|- style="background:#eaeaea;"
! scope="row" style="text-align:center" | 2004
| style="text-align:center" | 
| 33 || 14 || 1 || 3 || 130 || 57 || 187 || 58 || 25 || 0.1 || 0.2 || 9.3 || 4.1 || 13.4 || 4.1 || 1.8
|- 
! scope="row" style="text-align:center" | 2005
| style="text-align:center" | 
| 33 || 23 || 11 || 6 || 187 || 110 || 297 || 82 || 45 || 0.5 || 0.3 || 8.1 || 4.8 || 12.9 || 3.6 || 2.0
|- style="background:#eaeaea;"
! scope="row" style="text-align:center" | 2006
| style="text-align:center" | 
| 33 || 24 || 14 || 14 || 284 || 124 || 408 || 117 || 85 || 0.6 || 0.6 || 11.8 || 5.2 || 17.0 || 4.9 || 3.5
|-
! scope="row" style="text-align:center" | 2007
| style="text-align:center" | 
| 33 || 17 || 7 || 5 || 220 || 101 || 321 || 81 || 41 || 0.4 || 0.3 || 12.9 || 5.9 || 18.9 || 4.8 || 2.4
|- style="background:#eaeaea;"
! scope="row" style="text-align:center" | 2008
| style="text-align:center" | 
| 33 || 8 || 2 || 2 || 80 || 51 || 131 || 31 || 20 || 0.3 || 0.3 || 10.0 || 6.4 || 16.4 || 3.9 || 2.5
|-
! scope="row" style="text-align:center" | 2009
| style="text-align:center" | 
| 3 || 20 || 3 || 7 || 212 || 183 || 395 || 88 || 55 || 0.2 || 0.4 || 10.6 || 9.2 || 19.8 || 4.4 || 2.8
|- style="background:#eaeaea;"
! scope="row" style="text-align:center" | 2010
| style="text-align:center" | 
| 3 || 22 || 1 || 8 || 245 || 188 || 433 || 99 || 104 || 0.0 || 0.4 || 11.1 || 8.5 || 19.7 || 4.5 || 4.7
|- 
! scope="row" style="text-align:center" | 2011
| style="text-align:center" | 
| 3 || 21 || 5 || 4 || 220 || 198 || 418 || 74 || 98 || 0.2 || 0.2 || 10.5 || 9.4 || 19.9 || 3.5 || 4.7
|- style="background:#eaeaea;"
! scope="row" style="text-align:center" | 2012
| style="text-align:center" | 
| 3 || 25 || 2 || 2 || 350 || 141 || 491 || 150 || 67 || 0.1 || 0.1 || 14.0 || 5.6 || 19.6 || 6.0 || 2.7
|- 
! scope="row" style="text-align:center" | 2013
| style="text-align:center" | 
| 3 || 12 || 2 || 1 || 124 || 73 || 197 || 51 || 28 || 0.2 || 0.1 || 10.3 || 6.1 || 16.4 || 4.3 || 2.3
|- style="background:#eaeaea;"
! scope="row" style="text-align:center" | 2014
| style="text-align:center" | 
| 3 || 10 || 0 || 0 || 130 || 63 || 193 || 65 || 19 || 0.0 || 0.0 || 13.0 || 6.3 || 19.3 || 6.5 || 1.9
|- class="sortbottom"
! colspan=3| Career
! 203
! 52
! 58
! 2212
! 1306
! 3518
! 915
! 590
! 0.3
! 0.3
! 10.9
! 6.4
! 17.3
! 4.5
! 2.9
|}

References

External links

Adelaide Football Club players
1983 births
Living people
Sturt Football Club players
Australian rules footballers from Victoria (Australia)
Calder Cannons players
Adelaide Football Club (SANFL) players